Torture Garden  is  an album by John Zorn's Naked City with vocalist Yamatsuka Eye on vocals. The album collects the 42 "hardcore miniatures" recorded by the band.  Nine of these short intense improvisations were spread across Naked City and the other 33 would feature on the next album, Grand Guignol. As Zorn explained in 1990:Basically, this Naked City record (the first album on Nonesuch) came out, right. In the middle of it are about ten songs that are really short and hard. I said I wanted to do a record of 40 of those pieces, cause I was really interested in the compression and compactness of form that that music gets to. The guys at Nonesuch were not interested. If I wanted to do that, I better take it somewhere else. So what I managed to do was get them to bankroll the whole thing, and then I licensed it to Earache and Shimmy for basically no money and no royalties. So they are just putting this stuff out that Nonesuch bankrolled.

The tracks were re-released along with Leng Tch'e as Black Box in 1996 and in album sequence as part of Naked City: The Complete Studio Recordings in 2005.

The name for the collection comes from Le jardin des supplices, an 1899 decadent novel by Octave Mirbeau.

Reception
The Allmusic review by Bradley Torreano awarded the album 4 stars stating "Songs blur together but never get boring, no lyrics are actually sung, and few songs last longer than a minute. It also never takes itself seriously, a nice relief from Zorn's heavy-handed ambient collaborations. This would make a great introduction to the noise/jazz efforts that this group of musicians pioneered in the early 1990s."

Track listing 
All compositions by John Zorn and Yamatsuka Eye

 "Blood Is Thin" – 1:00
 "Demon Sanctuary" – 0:38
 "Thrash Jazz Assassin" – 0:45
 "Dead Spot" – 0:31
 "Bonehead" – 0:51
 "Speedball" – 0:17
 "Blood Duster" – 0:13
 "Pile Driver" – 0:33
 "Shangkuan Ling-Feng" – 1:14
 "Numbskull" – 0:29
 "Perfume of a Critic's Burning Flesh" – 0:24
 "Jazz Snob Eat Shit" – 0:24
 "The Prestigitator" – 0:43
 "No Reason to Believe" – 0:26
 "Hellraiser" – 0:39
 "Torture Garden" – 0:35
 "Slan" – 0:23
 "Hammerhead" – 0:08
 "The Ways of Pain" – 0:31
 "The Noose" – 0:10
 "Sack of Shit" – 0:43
 "Blunt Instrument" – 0:54
 "Osaka Bondage" – 1:14
 "Igneous Ejaculation" – 0:20
 "Shallow Grave" – 0:40
 "Ujaku" – 0:27
 "Kaoru" – 0:50
 "Dead Dread" – 0:45
 "Billy Liar" – 0:10
 "Victims of Torture" – 0:23
 "Speedfreaks" – 0:29
 "New Jersey Scum Swamp" – 0:41
 "S & M Sniper" – 0:14
 "Pigfucker" – 0:23
 "Cairo Chop Shop" – 0:23
 "Fuck the Facts" – 0:11
 "Obeah Man" – 0:17
 "Facelifter" – 0:34
 "N.Y. Flat Top Box" – 0:43
 "Whiplash" – 0:19
 "The Blade" – 0:36
 "Gob of Spit" – 0:18

Personnel
John Zorn – alto saxophone, vocals
Bill Frisell – guitar
Wayne Horvitz – keyboards
Fred Frith – bass
Joey Baron – drums
Yamatsuka Eye – vocals

References 

Elektra Records albums
Naked City (band) albums
Albums produced by John Zorn
John Zorn compilation albums
1989 compilation albums
Nonesuch Records compilation albums